The Audubon Parkway is a four-lane controlled-access freeway (formerly a toll road) connecting the cities of Henderson and Owensboro, Kentucky. Named for John James Audubon, an early American naturalist, the Audubon's western terminus is at US 41; the eastern terminus is US 60. It is also the only road in the parkway system that has not had the name of a Kentucky politician attached to it. The road carries the unsigned designation of Kentucky Route 9005 (KY 9005). A white and gold shield was used along the Audubon Parkway until 2006, when a new, standardized blue-on-white marker was introduced for all of Kentucky's parkways.

Route description

History

As a toll road
The Audubon Parkway, as with all eight of the other parkways, was originally a toll road from its 1970 opening until 2006. The only toll plaza on the Audubon was located at the exit 10 interchange at KY 416 near Hebbardsville, in eastern Henderson County.

Toll removal
The Audubon and the nearby William H. Natcher Parkway, which opened in 1972, were the last two remaining tolled parkways in Kentucky’s parkway system. They both had their tolls removed on Tuesday, November 21, 2006. Ernie Fletcher, who was governor at the time, announced the removal of the tolls at the Natcher Parkway's Hartford toll plaza in Ohio County on September 27, 2006. Fletcher himself manned the end loader which demolished one of the Audubon's Hebbardsville toll booths during a press conference and ceremony which heralded the end of toll collections.

With the end of toll collection, the Hebbardsville interchange was modified slightly, although its past as the parkway's only toll plaza remains in the modified-cloverleaf layout of the ramps, a trait shared by most such interchanges on Kentucky's other parkways. The islands where the toll booths were mounted were removed, and the pavement at the interchange was smoothed over, although the rumble strips approaching the interchange from both directions remain . During 2008, the former toll plaza office on the south side of the interchange was demolished.

Future

Interstate 69 Spur

Daviess County officials first proposed in 2005 that the Audubon be upgraded to an Interstate highway, specifically suggesting the number I-369. This would, according to the proposal, take place if and when the Interstate 69 Ohio River Bridge and its approaches are completed. The I-69 "spur" would connect Owensboro, Kentucky, to I-69 with I-369 as the likely designation.

The Audubon would have to be significantly upgraded in order for it to be approved as an Interstate Highway; the shoulders would need to be widened and the median would have to be widened or have a rigid safety barrier constructed along its entire  length.

The Audubon Parkway became a High Priority Interstate Corridor, referred to as the "Future Interstate Route 69 Spur" in the SAFETEA-LU Technical Corrections Act of 2008, which became Public Law 110-244 on June 6, 2008. New "Future I-69 Spur" signs were placed on the parkway in September 2008.

Exit list

References

External links

State Primary Road System in Daviess County
State Primary Road System in Henderson County
Exit list for Audubon Parkway
KentuckyRoads.com — Audubon Parkway

9005
Kentucky parkway system
Transportation in Daviess County, Kentucky
Transportation in Henderson County, Kentucky
Owensboro, Kentucky